Core city is the largest or most important city or cities of a metropolitan area.

Core cities may also refer to:
 Core cities of Japan
 Core Cities Group
 Core Cities Health Improvement Collaborative